Amata congener is a moth of the subfamily Arctiinae. It was described by George Hampson in 1901. It is found in Kenya.

References

 

Endemic moths of Kenya
congener
Moths described in 1901
Moths of Africa